The Chinese people or simply Chinese, are people or ethnic groups identified with China, usually through ethnicity, nationality, citizenship, or other affiliation.

Chinese people are known as Zhongguoren or as Huaren by speakers of standard Chinese, including those living in Greater China as well as overseas Chinese.  Although both terms both refer to Chinese people, their usage depends on the person and context. The former term is commonly (but not exclusively) used to refer to the citizens of the People's Republic of China—especially mainland China. The term Huaren  is used to refer to ethnic Chinese, and is more often used for those who reside overseas or are non-citizens of China.  

The Han Chinese are the largest ethnic group in China, comprising approximately 92% of its Mainland population. They comprise approximately 95% of the population of Taiwan, 92% in Hong Kong, and 89% in Macau. They are also the world's largest ethnic group, comprising approximately 18% of the global human population.

Outside China, the terms "Han Chinese" and "Chinese" are often wrongly conflated since those identifying or registered as Han Chinese are the dominant ethnic group in China. There are 55 officially-recognized ethnic minorities in China who are also Chinese by nationality.

People from Taiwan, officially the Republic of China (ROC), may also be referred to as "Chinese" in various contexts, though they are usually referred to as "Taiwanese". The territory of Taiwan is disputed and the ROC has limited recognition of its sovereignty.

The term "Overseas Chinese" is used to refer to people of Chinese origin living overseas as well as Chinese citizens residing outside China, but more commonly the former.

Ethnic groups in China and associated territories

A number of ethnic groups as well as other racial minorities of China are referred to as Chinese people.

Ethnic groups in China 
Han Chinese people, the largest ethnic group in China, are often wrongly referred to as "Chinese" or "ethnic Chinese" in English. The Han Chinese also form a majority or notable minority in other countries, and they comprise approximately 18% of the global human population.

Other ethnic groups in China include the Zhuang, Hui, Manchus, Uyghurs, and Miao, who make up the five largest ethnic minorities in mainland China, with populations of approximately 10 million or more. In addition, the Yi, Tujia, Tibetans and Mongols each have populations between five and ten million.

China, officially the People's Republic of China (PRC), recognizes 56 native Chinese ethnic groups. There are also several unrecognized ethnic groups in China.

Ethnic groups in dynastic China 
The term "Chinese people" (Manchu: Dulimbai gurun i niyalma) was used by the Qing government to refer to all traditionally native subjects of the empire, including Han, Manchu, and Mongols.

Zhonghua minzu (the "Chinese nation") 
Zhonghua minzu, the "Chinese nation", is a supra-ethnic concept which includes all 56 ethnic groups living in China that are officially recognized by the government of the People's Republic of China. It includes established ethnic groups who have lived within the borders of premodern China. The term zhonghua minzu was used during the Republic of China from 1911 to 1949 to refer to five primary ethnic groups in China. The term zhongguo renmin, "Chinese people", was the government's preferred term during the early communist era; zhonghua minzu is more common in recent decades.

Ethnic groups in Taiwan 

Taiwan, officially the Republic of China (ROC), recognizes 17 native Taiwanese ethnic groups as well as numerous other "New Immigrant" ethnic groups (mostly originating from Mainland China and Southeast Asia). Of the 17 native Taiwanese ethnic groups, 16 are considered to be indigenous (Taiwanese indigenous peoples), whereas one is considered to be non-native (Han Taiwanese). There are also several unrecognized indigenous ethnic groups in Taiwan.

The Han Taiwanese, who are Han Chinese people living in Taiwan, are usually categorized by the Taiwanese government into three main ethnic groups; the Taiwanese Hoklos, Taiwanese Hakkas, and waishengren (i.e. "Mainland Chinese people in Taiwan"). The Kinmenese and Matsunese peoples are two other significant Han Taiwanese ethnic groups.

The Taiwanese Hoklos and Hakkas are both considered to be "native" populations of Taiwan since they first began migrating to Taiwan in significant numbers from Fujian and Guangdong over 400 years ago (they first began migrating to Taiwan in minor numbers several centuries earlier). They are often collectively referred to in Taiwanese Mandarin as "Benshengren" (meaning "people from this province"). Those self-identifying as Hoklo culturally comprise approximately 70% of Taiwan's total population and the Hakkas comprise approximately 14% of Taiwan's total population.

Meanwhile, the so-called Mainlanders (Taiwanese) are mostly descended from people who migrated from mainland China to Taiwan during the 1940s and 1950s. They are often referred to in Taiwanese Mandarin as "Waishengren" (meaning "people from outside of this province"). The Mainlanders (Taiwanese) comprise approximately 14% of Taiwan's total population.

Collectively, the various Taiwanese indigenous peoples comprise approximately 2% of Taiwan's total population. The various Taiwanese indigenous peoples are believed to have been living in Taiwan for up to 6000 years prior to the colonization of Taiwan by China which began during the 17th century (CE).

Recognition by the Chinese government 
The Han Taiwanese, Native Taiwanese (Benshengren), Hoklo Taiwanese, Hakka Taiwanese, Mainlander Taiwanese (Waishengren), Kinmenese, and Matsunese ethnic groups (all subtypes or branches of the Han Chinese ethnic group) are all unrecognized by the Chinese government. Furthermore, the sixteen Taiwanese indigenous peoples that are officially recognized by the Taiwanese government are also all unrecognized by the Chinese government. The Chinese government also doesn't recognize the ethnic designation "New Immigrant".

The Chinese government instead has its own ethnic designations for Taiwanese people. Han Taiwanese people are considered to be Han Chinese people (no distinction is made), whereas the various recognized and unrecognized (by Taiwan) Taiwanese indigenous peoples are collectively recognized (by China) to be "Gaoshanren" (i.e. "High Mountain People"). The Gaoshanren are one of the 56 officially-recognized ethnic groups of China.

Nationality, citizenship and residence 

The Nationality law of the People's Republic of China regulates nationality within the PRC. A person obtains nationality either by birth when at least one parent is of Chinese nationality or by naturalization. All people holding nationality of the People's Republic of China are citizens of the Republic. The Resident Identity Card is the official form of identification for residents of the People's Republic of China.

Within the People's Republic of China, a Hong Kong Special Administrative Region passport or Macao Special Administrative Region passport may be issued to permanent residents of Hong Kong or Macao, respectively.

The Nationality law of the Republic of China regulates nationality within the Republic of China (Taiwan). A person obtains nationality either by birth or by naturalization. A person with at least one parent who is a national of the Republic of China, or born in the ROC to stateless parents qualifies for nationality by birth.

The National Identification Card is an identity document issued to people who have household registration in Taiwan. The Resident Certificate is an identification card issued to residents of the Republic of China who do not hold a National Identification Card.

The relationship between ROC nationality and PRC nationality is disputed.

Overseas Chinese 

Overseas Chinese refers to people of Chinese ethnicity or national heritage who live outside the People's Republic of China or Taiwan as the result of the continuing diaspora. People with one or more Chinese ancestors may consider themselves overseas Chinese. Such people vary widely in terms of cultural assimilation. In some areas throughout the world ethnic enclaves known as Chinatowns are home to populations of overseas Chinese.

This is especially so in the Chinese communities of Southeast Asia. The term Zhongguoren has a more political or ideological aspect in its use; while many in China may use Zhongguoren to mean the Chinese ethnicity, some in Taiwan would refuse to be called Zhongguoren.

See also

 For countries with significant populations
 Chinese Thailanders
 Chinese Malaysians
 Chinese Singaporean 

 For countries with noteworthy populations

 Chinese Canadian
 Chinese Filipino
 Chinese Bruneian
 Chinese Australian
 Chinese New Zealander

 Other countries with Chinese populations

 Chinese Indonesian
 Chinese Korean
 Chinese Vietnamese
 Chinese American
 Chinese Burmese
 Chinese Cambodian
 Chinese Laotian
 Chinese Russian
 Chinese Italian
 British Chinese
 Chinese Caribbean
 Chinese Cuban
 Chinese Dominican
 Chinese Guyanese
 Chinese Jamaican
 Chinese Trinidadian and Tobagonian
 Chinese Surinamese
 Chinese Puerto Rican
 Chinese Brazilian
 Chinese Argentine
 Chinese Mexican
 Chinese Peruvian
 Chinese Venezuelan

 Related topics of interest
 Chinese ancestral veneration
 Chinese folk religion
 Chinese nationality
 Ethnic minorities in China
 Ethnic groups in Chinese history
 Unrecognized ethnic groups in China
 Chinese people in New York City

References

External links

 Chinese Ethnic Minorities
 

 
Broad-concept articles